These 114 genera belong to the family Lygaeidae, seed bugs. There are at least 980 described species in Lygaeidae.

Lygaeidae genera

 Aborsillus Barber, 1954
 Acanthocrompus Scudder, 1958
 Achlyosomus Slater Alex, 1992
 Acrobrachys Horvath, 1914
 Acroleucus Stal, 1874
 Aethalotus Stal, 1874
 Afraethalotus Scudder, 1963
 Anochrostomus Slater Alex, 1992
 Apterola Mulsant & Rey, 1866
 Arocatus Spinola, 1837
 Aspilocoryphus Stal, 1874
 Aspilogeton Breddin, 1901
 Astacops Boisduval, 1835
 Aulacopeltus Stal, 1868
 Austronysius Ashlock, 1967
 Balionysius Ashlock, 1967
 Belonochilus Uhler, 1871
 Biblochrimnus Brailovsky, 1982
 Caenocoris Fieber, 1860
 Camptocoris Puton, 1886
 Caprhiobia Scudder, 1962
 Cerocrompus Scudder, 1958
 Coleonysius Ashlock, 1967
 Congolorgus Scudder, 1962
 Cosmopleurus Stal, 1872
 Craspeduchus Stal, 1874
 Crompus Stal, 1874
 Cuyonysius Dellapé & Henry, 2020
 Dalmochrimnus Brailovsky, 1982
 Darwinysius Ashlock, 1967
 Ektyphonotus Slater Alex, 1992
 Emphanisis China, 1925
 Eurynysius Ashlock, 1967
 Glyptonysius Usinger, 1942
 Gondarius Stys, 1972
 Graptostethus Stal, 1868
 Hadrosomus Slater Alex, 1992
 Haematorrhytus Stal, 1874
 Haemobaphus Stal, 1874
 Hormopleurus Horvath, 1884
 Horvathiolus Josifov, 1965
 Hyalonysius Slater, 1962
 Karachicoris Stys, 1972
 Kleidocerys Stephens, 1829
 Koscocrompus Scudder, 1958
 Kualisompus Scudder, 1962
 Latochrimnus Brailovsky, 1982
 Lepionysius Ashlock, 1967
 Lepiorsillus Malipatil, 1979
 Lygaeites Heer, 1853
 Lygaeodema Horvath, 1924
 Lygaeosoma Spinola, 1837
 Lygaeospilus Barber, 1921
 Lygaeus Fabricius, 1794
 Madrorgus Scudder, 1962
 Melacoryphus Slater Alex, 1988
 Melanerythrus Stal, 1868
 Melanocoryphus Stal, 1872
 Melanopleuroides Slater & Baranowski, 2001
 Melanopleurus Stal, 1874
 Melanostethus Stal, 1868
 Melanotelus Reuter, 1885
 Metrarga White, 1878
 Microspilus Stal, 1868
 Neacoryphus Scudder, 1965
 Neocrompus China, 1930
 Neokleidocerys Scudder, 1962
 Neortholomus Hamilton, 1983
 Neseis Kirkaldy, 1910
 Nesoclimacias Kirkaldy, 1908
 Nesocryptias Kirkaldy, 1908
 Nesomartis Kirkaldy, 1907
 Nesostethus Kirkaldy, 1908
 Nicuesa Distant, 1893
 Nithecus Horvath, 1890
 Nysius Dallas, 1852  (false chinch bugs)
 Oceanides Kirkaldy, 1910
 Ochrimnus Stal, 1874
 Ochrostomus Stal, 1874
 Oncopeltus Stal, 1868
 Oreolorgus Scudder, 1962
 Oreonysius Usinger, 1952
 Orsillacis Barber, 1914
 Orsillus Dallas, 1852
 Ortholomus Stal, 1872
 Oxygranulobaphus Brailovsky, 1982
 Paranysius Horvath, 1895
 Polychisme Kirkaldy, 1904
 Pseudoacroleucoides Brailovsky, 1982
 Psileula Seidenstucker, 1964
 Pylorgus Stal, 1874
 Pyrrhobaphus Stal, 1868
 Reticulatonysius Malipatil, 2005
 Rhiophila Bergroth, 1918
 Rhypodes Stal, 1868
 Robinsonocoris Kormilev, 1952
 Scopiastella Slater, 1957
 Scopiastes Stal, 1874
 Sinorsillus Usinger, 1938
 Spilostethus Stal, 1868
 Stalagmostethus Stal, 1868
 Stenaptula Seidenstucker, 1964
 Stictocricus Horvath, 1914
 Syzygitis Bergroth, 1921
 Thunbergia Horvath, 1914  (thunberg seedbugs)
 Torvochrimnus Brailovsky, 1982
 Tropidothorax Bergroth, 1894
 Woodwardiastes Slater Alex, 1985
 Xyonysius Ashlock & Lattin, 1963
 Zygochrimnus Brailovsky, 2018
 † Lygaenocoris Popov, 1961
 † Mesolygaeus Ping, 1928
 † Oligacanthus Hong, 1980
 † Sinolygaeus Hong, 1980

References